Menuthiocrioceras is an ammonite genus from the Early Cretaceous belonging to the Ancyloceratoidea. Fossils belonging to this genus were found in Madagascar and Indonesia.

Species
Species within the genus Menuthiocrioceras include:
M. ampakabense Collignon, 1962
M. aontzyense Collignon, 1962
M. besairiei Collignon, 1949
M. colcanapi Collignon, 1962
M. compressum Skwarko & Thieuloy, 1989
M. hourcqui Collignon, 1949
M. irianense Skwarko & Thieuloy, 1989
M. kuntzi Collignon, 1962
M. lenoblei Collignon, 1949
M. mahafalense Collignon, 1962
M. sarkari Collignon, 1962
M. sornayi Collignon, 1962

References

Ammonitida genera
Crioceratitidae
Early Cretaceous ammonites
Ammonites of Africa
Ammonites of Asia